Andy Roddick defeated Tomáš Berdych in the final, 7–5, 6–4 to win the men's singles tennis title at the 2010 Miami Open. It was his first Masters title since 2006, and his second career Miami Open title.

Andy Murray was the defending champion, but lost to Mardy Fish in the second round.

Seeds
All seeds receive a bye into the second round.

Draw

Finals

Top half

Section 1

Section 2

Section 3

Section 4

Bottom half

Section 5

Section 6

Section 7

Section 8

Qualifying

Seeds

Qualifiers

Lucky losers

Draw

First qualifier

Second qualifier

Third qualifier

Fourth qualifier

Fifth qualifier

Sixth qualifier

Seventh qualifier

Eighth qualifier

Ninth qualifier

Tenth qualifier

Eleventh qualifier

Twelfth qualifier

External links
Main Draw
Qualifying Draw

2010 ATP World Tour
2010 Sony Ericsson Open
Men in Florida